Corinne Houart is a Belgian biomedical scientist who is Professor of Developmental Biology at King's College London. She also serves as editor of the Centre for Developmental Neurobiology. She was elected to the European Molecular Biology Organization in 2021.

Early life and education 
Houart studied biomedical sciences at the Université Libre de Bruxelles. She remained there for doctoral research, where she studied gene regulation in cancer. After a career break in Mexico, Houart moved to the University of Oregon, where she became an expert in zebrafish genetics. She identified that the anterior neural border and the Wnt/beta-catenin pathway were essential for forebrain regionalisation. She showed that the specification of the forebrain took place at the neural plate stage.

Research and career 
In 2001, Houart started her own laboratory in London, where she was made a professor in 2008. She has since studied the molecular mechanisms that underpin the development of zebrafish forebrains. She has also been studying the similarities between the regionalisation of zebrafish and mouse brains. By better understanding the brains of zebrafish, Houart believes it will be possible to better understand neurodegeneration.

In 2016, Houart was awarded the Medical Research Council Suffrage Science award and she was elected to the European Molecular Biology Organization in 2021.

Selected publications

References 

Living people
Belgian geneticists
Université libre de Bruxelles alumni
University of Oregon alumni
Academics of King's College London
20th-century Belgian women scientists
21st-century Belgian women scientists
Year of birth missing (living people)